Townsendiella rufiventris is a cuckoo bee species in the family Apidae.

The distribution of Townsendiella rufiventris includes Central America and North America.

References

Further reading
 

Nomadinae
Insects described in 1942